"My Old Man" is a song co-written and recorded by American country music artist Rodney Atkins.  It was released in October 2002 as the second single from his 2003 album Honesty. The song reached #36 on the US Billboard Hot Country Singles & Tracks chart.  Atkins wrote this song with Ted Hewitt.

Chart performance

References

2002 singles
2002 songs
Rodney Atkins songs
Songs written by Rodney Atkins
Curb Records singles
Songs written by Ted Hewitt